"Pipe It Up" is a song by American hip hop group Migos. It was released on July 7, 2015 as the second single from their debut studio album Yung Rich Nation (2015). The song was produced by Murda Beatz.

Background and composition
Caitlin White of Stereogum described the song as "built off an impossibly fast Migos-flow trademarked hook, burbling synthesizers, and a clean, crisp little piano tinkle". Migos uses the phrase "pipe it up" as a response to different situations. The rap in a triplet rhythm pattern. In the song, they also declare they invented the phrase "pipe it up" and predict it will become popular.

Music video
The music video was released on August 3, 2015. It sees Quavo and Takeoff performing, with people from a neighborhood, including kids, who show dancing moves. Offset does not appear in the video.

Remix
The official remix of the song features American rappers 2 Chainz and Jeezy. Trevor Smith of HotNewHipHop praised 2 Chainz's verse, describing that he is a perfect fit for the "bouncy" instrumental, "coming through with some of his most hilariously inventive punchlines in a minute".

Charts

References

2015 singles
2015 songs
Migos songs
300 Entertainment singles
Songs written by Quavo
Songs written by Takeoff (rapper)
Songs written by Murda Beatz